Pan de Azúcar (translated "sugar loaf" or "sugar bread") may refer to 

Pan de Azúcar or Wak'a Wallamarka, an archaeological site in Peru
Pan de Azúcar National Park, a park in Chile
Club Deportivo Pan de Azúcar, a football club in Panama
Pan de Azúcar hill, in Peru
Cerro Pan de Azúcar, a hill in Uruguay
Pan de Azúcar, Uruguay, a city in Maldonado Department, Uruguay
Pico Pan de Azúcar, a mountain in Venezuela
Pan de Azucar, an island in the Philippines
Pan de Azúcar, a volcano in Ecuador
Pan de Azúcar, a mountain in the Sierra Nevada del Cocuy, Colombia
Pan de Azúcar (dome), a lava dome group in Argentina
Pan de Azúcar Formation, geological formation in Chile

See also
Sugarloaf (disambiguation)